The Harvard Islands are an island group east of Qaanaaq in the Avannaata Municipality, northwestern Greenland.

They are located near the head of the Inglefield Fjord, north of the mouth of the Academy Fjord and just east of the terminus of the Heilprin Glacier. The village of Qeqertat is located on the islands.

See also
List of islands of Greenland

References

Islands of Greenland